Sedgewick-Coronation was a provincial electoral district in Alberta mandated to return a single member to the Legislative Assembly of Alberta using the first past the post method of voting from 1963 to 1979.

Sedgewick-Coronation is named for the Town of Sedgewick, Alberta and the Town of Coronation, Alberta.

Members of the Legislative Assembly (MLAs)

Electoral history

1963 general election

1967 general election

1971 general election

1975 general election

See also
Sedgewick, Alberta, a town in central Alberta
Coronation, Alberta, a town in central Alberta
List of Alberta provincial electoral districts

References

Further reading

External links
Elections Alberta
The Legislative Assembly of Alberta

Former provincial electoral districts of Alberta